Maunabo may refer to:

Maunabo, Puerto Rico, a municipality of Puerto Rico
Maunabo River, in Puerto Rico
Maunabo Leones, a Puerto Rican soccer team